Newtyle railway station served the village of Newtyle, Angus, Scotland from 1831 to 1868 on the Dundee and Newtyle Railway.

History 
The station opened on 16 December 1831 by the Dundee and Newtyle Railway. It was the northern terminus of the line at the time situated north of Hatton station. The station closed, being replaced by the new  station, on 31 August 1868.

References

External links 

Disused railway stations in Angus, Scotland
Railway stations in Great Britain opened in 1831
Railway stations in Great Britain closed in 1868
1831 establishments in Scotland
1868 disestablishments in Scotland